Jean-Joseph Fiocco (15 December 1686 – 30 March 1746) was a Flemish composer of the high and late Baroque period.

His father was the Venetian composer Pietro Antonio Fiocco (1654–1714), and his brothers included the violinist Joseph-Hector.  Jean-Joseph was active in the Austrian Netherlands and - during his time as choirmaster of Maria Elisabeth of Austria's chapel-royal in Brussels  - he trained the composer Ignaz Vitzthumb and the violinist Pieter van Maldere.  Fiocco's main works were nine Repons de mort, to French texts, now thought to be lost.

Sources
The New Grove Dictionary of Music and Musicians

External links
Jean-Joseph Fiocco, Requiem Survey.

Flemish Baroque composers
Belgian classical composers
Belgian male classical composers
1686 births
1746 deaths
18th-century classical composers
18th-century male musicians
18th-century musicians